Benton Township is one of the twelve townships of Ottawa County, Ohio, United States.  The 2000 census found 2,621 people in the township, 2,232 of whom lived in the unincorporated portions of the township.

Geography
Located in the northwestern part of the county, it borders the following townships:
Jerusalem Township, Lucas County - north
Carroll Township - east
Salem Township - southeast
Harris Township - south
Clay Township - southwest
Allen Township - northwest

The village of Rocky Ridge lies in the southeastern part of the township, and the unincorporated community of Graytown lies in the township's southwest.

Benton Township is also the location of the Ottawa National Wildlife Refuge and Crane Creek State Park.

Name and history
Statewide, other Benton Townships are located in Hocking, Monroe, Paulding, and Pike counties.

Government
The township is governed by a three-member board of trustees, who are elected in November of odd-numbered years to a four-year term beginning on the following January 1. Two are elected in the year after the presidential election and one is elected in the year before it. There is also an elected township fiscal officer, who serves a four-year term beginning on April 1 of the year after the election, which is held in November of the year before the presidential election. Vacancies in the fiscal officership or on the board of trustees are filled by the remaining trustees.

References

External links
County website

Townships in Ottawa County, Ohio
Townships in Ohio